Falcon Nest is a detached residence in Prescott, Arizona, that is the tallest single family home in North America at . Its name is attributed to its resemblance to a large mountainside bird's nest and the peregrine falcons that inhabit the area. It is located in Yavapai County, approximately a two-hour drive northwest of Arizona's capitol, Phoenix.

History

It was built in 1994 at a cost of approximately $3.5million and is located on the slopes of Thumb Butte, a prominent geographical feature of the Sierra Prieta mountain range in the Prescott National Forest and a popular hiking venue with trails that ascend and encircle the butte, a  volcanic plug. According to Pal, since the house is below the summit of the butte, Falcon Nest was an appropriate name as falcons typically nest at lower elevations than eagles, who take the highest perches.

Configuration
Much of the main floor extends out from the core of the structure similar to large fully enclosed balconies on four sides. This  area is built as a solarium with glass walls and roof. It includes two bedrooms, two bathrooms, a kitchen, and a great room. A third bedroom and two additional bathrooms are on other levels. Although local zoning codes do not normally allow homes of this height, the lowest two floors are considered basement levels, three floors are livable space, and the remainder is a natural convective cooling and passive solar heating system. A hydraulic elevator provides access to the main level on the sixth floor from the ground level. Stairs, 135 in total, are used to access the upper floors and as an alternative to the elevator. Falcon Nest is built upon natural granite, held in place by gravity without other physical attachment. Pal claims this will minimize damage in the event of earthquake activity.

Location
Hundreds of sites were considered before Pal chose the Thumb Butte location. The approximately  site allowed for views for long distances in many directions, and regulations in other areas precluded building such a structure. Opposition to the project caused Prescott's zoning laws to be changed; the house could not be built today. The property's western border abuts the Prescott National Forest.

Sale
The house was listed for sale in 2015 for $2.8million, and again in 2017 for $1.5million. In addition to its use as a home, it was marketed as a potential educational, office, museum, lodging, or event space. After a failed attempt was to sell the house by auction in May 2017, it was relisted for $2.8million as was still for sale as of August 2017. The house was sold on March 29, 2018, to astrologer Ernst Wilhelm and artist Srishti Wilhelm for both living and office use.

In media
The home was featured on Extreme Homes on the HGTV network in 1994. It was featured as "House of the Day" in The Wall Street Journal on May6, 2015. The April 2017 issue of greenliving AZ included an article on the house.

Notes

References

External links
 Falcon Nest Luxury Home, Prescott Arizona

Yavapai County, Arizona
Prescott, Arizona
Tourist attractions in Yavapai County, Arizona
Houses in Yavapai County, Arizona
Houses completed in 1994
1994 establishments in Arizona